The Brawley Formation is a geologic formation in the Colorado Desert of southern California, located in northwestern Imperial County and eastern San Diego County.

Geology
Sandstone and mudstone of the Brawley Formation accumulated between ~1.1 and ~0.6–0.5 Ma in a delta on the margin of an arid Pleistocene lake.  It is in the San Jacinto Fault Zone area, including in the San Felipe Hills.

Fossils
It preserves fossils from the Pleistocene Epoch of the Quaternary Period, during the Cenozoic Era.

See also

 
 
 
 List of fossiliferous stratigraphic units in California
 Paleontology in California

References

Further reading
 

Geologic formations of California
Pleistocene California
Pleistocene Series of North America
Pleistocene geology
Colorado Desert
Geology of Imperial County, California
Geology of San Diego County, California
Brawley, California